William Fox (c.1827–9 April 1890) was a New Zealand gold prospector and goldminer. He was born in Ireland on c.1827. After his discovery of gold in the Arrow River in Otago in 1862 the mining township that sprang up was briefly known as Fox's, before becoming Arrowtown.

References

1820s births
1890 deaths
New Zealand miners
New Zealand gold prospectors
Irish emigrants to New Zealand (before 1923)
People of the Otago Gold Rush